This is a list of benefit corporations.

A
 :Allbirds
 :Alter Eco

B
 :Beau's All Natural Brewing Company
 :Ben & Jerry's
 :Beneficial State Bank
 :Broadway Financial Corporation
 :Bullfrog Power
 :Business Development Bank of Canada
Bolst Inc.

C
 :Cabot Creamery
 :Care2
 :Casebook PBC
 :Change.org
 :Chiesi Farmaceutici
 :Carrot Rewards
 Compost Crew
 :Corporate Knights
 Cotopaxi

D
 Danone North America

E
 :EcoZoom
 :Ecosia
 :Eileen Fisher
 :Encantos Media
 :Equity Schools
 :Etsy

F
 :FlipGive
 :Free Range Studios

G
 :Greyston Bakery
 :Greenlight Biosciences

H
 :Hootsuite

K
 :Kickstarter
 :King Arthur Flour

I 

 Iroquois Valley Farmland REIT

L
 Lemonade
 :Lifeblue

N
 Neighborhood Sun
 :New Belgium Brewing Company
 :New Resource Bank
 :North Coast Brewing Company
 :Numi Organic Tea

P
 Patagonia
 :Picaroons Traditional Ales
 :Planet Labs
 :Public News Service

S
 Saxbys Coffee
 :Seventh Generation Inc.
 :Sustainable Produce Urban Delivery

T
 :The Honest Company
 :Tofurky

U
 :UncommonGoods
 :Utne Reader

V
 :Vermont Creamery
 :Velatura
 :Veeva

W
 :Warby Parker

Y
 :YouCaring

References

Benefit corporations
Benefit